The 2009 MPS Group Championships was a women's tennis tournament played on outdoor clay courts. It was the 30th edition of the MPS Group Championships but first held in its new location, and was part of the International series of the 2009 WTA Tour. It took place at the Sawgrass Country Club in Ponte Vedra Beach, Florida, from April 6 through April 12, 2009. Caroline Wozniacki won the singles title.

Finals

Singles

 Caroline Wozniacki defeated  Aleksandra Wozniak, 6–1, 6–2
It was Wozniacki's first title of the year, and 4th of her career.

Doubles

 Chuang Chia-jung /  Sania Mirza defeated  Květa Peschke /  Lisa Raymond, 6–3, 4–6, [10–7]

External links
 ITF tournament edition details

MPS Group Championships
Amelia Island Championships
MPS Group Championships
MPS Group Championships
MPS Group Championships